Parkersburg High School–Washington Avenue Historic District, is a national historic district located at Parkersburg, Wood County, West Virginia. The Parkersburg High School was built in 1917 north of the Avery Street Historic District in the Jacobethan Revival style.  It was designed by Ohio architect Frank Packard (1866-1923).

It was listed to the National Register of Historic Places in 1992.

References

Buildings and structures in Parkersburg, West Virginia
National Register of Historic Places in Wood County, West Virginia
Historic districts on the National Register of Historic Places in West Virginia
Colonial Revival architecture in West Virginia
Gothic Revival architecture in West Virginia
Tudor Revival architecture in West Virginia
Historic districts in Wood County, West Virginia